Rocky Balboa is a fictional boxer, who is the main character in the Rocky film series.

Rocky Balboa may also refer to:

 Rocky Balboa (film series), series of American boxing sports-drama films
 Rocky Balboa (film), 2006 film and 6th entry in the film series
 Rocky Balboa: The Best of Rocky (2006 album), compilation album of music from the film series
 Rocky Balboa (video game), 2007 videogame based on the 2006 film

See also
 Rocky (disambiguation)
 Balboa (disambiguation)
 Rocky Marciano (1923-1969) U.S. boxer, inspiration for the character's name and fighting style
 Chuck Wepner (born 1939) U.S. boxer, inspiration for the character and first film of the series
 Great White Hope (disambiguation)